Thomas Clendinen Catchings (January 11, 1847 – December 24, 1927) was a U.S. Representative from Mississippi.

Early life and education
Thomas Clendenin Catchings was born January 11, 1847, at "Fleetwood" in Hinds County, Mississippi, to Dr. T. J. and Nancy M. (née Clendenin) and Catchings. Tutored at home until September 1860, he entered the State University at Oxford where he was a member of St. Anthony Hall. In 1861 he entered Oakland College near Rodney. He entered the Confederate States Army in 1861 and served as a private in Company K, 18th Mississippi Infantry Regiment, and subsequently in Company C, 11th Mississippi Cavalry Regiment.

Political career 
He was admitted to the bar in 1866 and commenced practice in Vicksburg. Catchings was elected to the State Senate in 1875 but resigned in 1877. Catchings was elected attorney general in 1877. He was reelected in 1881 and served until February 16, 1885.

Catchings, a Democrat, was elected to the 49th and to the seven succeeding Congresses (March 4, 1885–March 3, 1901) after winning a disputed election against Cornelius Jones, an African American lawyer and state legislator. Catchings served as chairman of the Committee on Levees and Improvements of the Mississippi River (50th Congress), Committee on Railways and Canals (52nd and 53rd Congress), Committee on Rivers and Harbors (53rd Congress). He first introduced a bill for Vicksburg National Military Park in January 1896. When it failed to pass, although favorably reported by committee, he re-introduced it in the next Congress in December 1897.

Later life 
Later, Catchings was employed as division counsel for the Southern Railway. Appointed by Governor Vardaman, he also served as a member of the Mississippi Code Commission. He died in Vicksburg on December 24, 1927, and was interred in Cedar Hill Cemetery.

References

External links 

 Thomas C. Catchings at The Political Graveyard

1847 births
1927 deaths
11th Mississippi Cavalry Regiment
Confederate States Army soldiers
Democratic Party members of the United States House of Representatives from Mississippi
Mississippi Attorneys General